The Decauville Tramway at Exposition Universelle in Gent, 1913 (French Tramway de Decauville Ainé) was a temporary narrow gauge railroad with a gauge of , which was operated during the World Fair held in Ghent from 26 April to 3 November 1913.

History 
After the success of the Decauville railway at Exposition Universelle (1889) in Paris, the Belgian subsidiary of the French company Decauville in Corbeil-Essonnes exhibited their products also at the Exposition universelle et internationale (1913).

Route 
The route passed amongst others the following stations:
 Palais de Beaux Arts
 Ville de Paris
 Delhaize Freres & Cie ‹Le Leon›
 Modern Village
 Rue Belvedere
 Chateau d’eau

The Depot was between the Modernen Village and the sport fields.

Operation 
Eight Montania locomotives of the Paris branch of Orenstein & Koppel and Arthur Koppel were used on the temporarily laid line. They could be operated with benzene, petrol, alcohol or petroleum. On the side of the engine cover they had a discreet lettering of the company 'Decauville', which was responsible for the distribution of this locomotive in Belgium.

The operation was carried out by a 24-strong team of 10 locomotive drivers, 12 uniformed conductors, a railway attendant dressed in white and the train dispatcher.

External links 
 Photos at www.gent1913.eu/

References 

Defunct railroads
Decauville
600 mm gauge railways
Transport in Ghent